Shiloh House is a historic house at 1300 Shiloh Boulevard in Zion, Illinois. John Alexander Dowie, the founder of Zion, built the house in 1902–03; he lived there until his death in 1907. Architect Paul Burkhardt of Chicago, who worked on many of Zion's early buildings, designed the home. Burkhardt's design incorporated the Queen Anne and Swiss chalet styles. After Dowie's death, the house passed through several owners, including the Great Lakes Bible Institute; the school used the house for twelve years before moving to Missouri in 1945. The Zion Historical Society bought the house and renovated it for a new headquarters in 1967.

The house was added to the National Register of Historic Places on May 12, 1977.

References

National Register of Historic Places in Lake County, Illinois
Houses on the National Register of Historic Places in Illinois
Queen Anne architecture in Illinois
Swiss chalet architecture
Houses completed in 1903